Mixed member majoritarian representation (MMM) is type of a mixed electoral system combining majoritarian and proportional methods, where the disproportional results of the majoritarian side of the system prevail over the proportional component. Mixed member majoritarian systems are therefore also as a type of semi-proportional representation, and are usually contrasted with mixed-member proportional representation (MMP) which aims to provide proportional representation via additional compensation ("top-up") seats.

The most common type of MMM system is called parallel voting also, known as the supplementary member (SM) system, whereby representatives are voted into a chamber using at least two different systems independently of each other. Most commonly this combines first-past-the-post (single member plurality) voting (FPTP/SMP) with party-list proportional representation (list-PR). The system has been applied in the election of national parliaments as well as local governments in various places such as Taiwan, Lithuania and Russia. While FPTP with list-PR is the most common pairing in parallel systems, any other combination is effectively possible and therefore not all parallel voting systems are mixed-member majoritarian, however as most of them used in practice are, the terms are sometimes used interchangeably.

Types 
According to the academic typology of Massicotte & Blais (1999), mixed-member majoritarian versions come in the following forms:

 Superposition, or the supplementary member (SM) system where two different systems are used on different levels of the electoral system in a non-compensatory manner. This means if a party gets a disproportionally high share of seats in the majoritarian tier, they retain this absolute advantage even as their relative (percentage-wise) advantage may decrease due to a proportional component.
 Parallel voting is defined by the voter having two votes and there being no interaction between the two (or more) component systems of the election, like the two-round system and list-PR (Lithuania) or party block voting and list-PR (Andorra).
 There also exists a single vote version of superposition systems, in which the voter may not split their votes on the different levels of the election, but a single vote automatically determines both the local candidate and the party choice of the voter. Such a system is used in Italy (Rosatellum) for both houses of parliament which disallows vote splitting, thereby effectively using a mixed single vote.
 In some systems, such as the one used in Pakistan, list PR seats are not distributed based on votes cast, but proportionally with seats already won by the parties using FPTP/SMP. This means the winning parties absolute advantage over other parties increases in terms of seats won, and their relative (percentage-wise) majoritarian advantage stays the same.
 Fusion, or majority jackpot system (MBS) used in Italy and France for regional elections or where a group of councillors are chosen by a party-list system, and the remaining part with a general ticket, so to ensure that a single list wins well over half the seats.
 Correction or compensation means some countries use mixed-member majoritarian systems which have limited (compensatory) interaction between the local (FPTP/SMP) and national (list-PR) tiers, the additional-member system can be considered such a system, however such methods sometimes are classified under MMP.
 Coexistence: some type of mixed systems do not have two tiers (and so also use a single vote), but use majoritarian representation in many constituencies (single-member districts) but use proportional representations is some (multi-member districts), which makes the system as a whole mixed-member majoritarian.
 Supermixed: In Hungary, elections to the National Assembly use the list vote as a parallel system would, but also add unused votes ("fractional votes" of both district winners and losers). In South Korea most list seats are allocated non-compensatory (supplementary members) as in parallel voting, but a small part of list seats (additional members) is allocated using the additional member system (AMS), which makes it partially compensatory (the effect however is cancelled by the party-list splitting strategy).

Advantages and disadvantages

General 
Mixed-member majoritarian systems generally allow smaller parties that cannot win individual elections to secure some representation in the legislature; however, unlike in a proportional system they will have a substantially smaller delegation than their share of the total vote. It is also argued that MMM does not lead to the degree of fragmentation found in party systems under forms of proportional representation, which some consider to be an advantage and some a disadvantage.

A criticism of adding a proportional component to majoritarian electoral systems is that the largest parties are more likely to rely on the support of smaller ones in order to form a government, than if the system was majoritarian only. However, smaller parties are still disadvantaged as the larger parties still predominate. In countries where there is one dominant party and a divided opposition, the proportional seats may be essential for allowing an effective opposition. Furthermore, the likelihood of no governing majority is dependent on many other factors, same as under first-past-the-post.

In parallel voting and other supplementary member systems, there is a chance that two classes of representatives will emerge under an SM system: with one class beholden to their electorate seat, and the other concerned only with their party.

The major critique of MMM systems is that they cannot guarantee overall proportionality. Large parties can win very large majorities, disproportionate to their percentage vote. For example, in the 2014 Hungarian election, the Fidesz/KDNP grouping won 133 of 199 Parliamentary seats with 44.87% of the overall vote.

Combined with a high threshold, small parties may still be shut out of representation entirely despite winning a substantial portion of the overall vote. So that their constituency vote is not wasted, voters may vote for a large party's local candidate tactically, while voters of large parties may vote for allied smaller parties with their list vote so as to help them over the threshold. An example of this being played out can be seen in the 2014 Japanese election where the government's junior coalition partner, Komeito took only 1.5% in the local constituencies, but 13.7% on the PR list. Most of the Komeito votes came from the ruling Liberal Democratic Party.

Compared to mixed member proportional 
Mixed-member majoritarian (MMM) systems are often contrasted with mixed-Member proportional (MMP) systems. There are a unique set of advantages and disadvantages that apply to this specific comparison.

Under MMM a party that can gerrymander local districts can win more than its share of seats, so parallel systems need fair criteria to draw district boundaries. Normally, under mixed member proportional representation a gerrymander can help a local candidate, but it cannot raise a major party's share of seats, unless the compensatory link is effectively disentangled, for example using decoy lists and tactical voting.

In Japan, an electoral system based on a single-seat constituency system was introduced in 1994 to facilitate a change of government and prevent corruption. It was decided that a portion of the seats would be elected through a proportional representation system to accommodate minority parties. In Japan's political culture, however, this system further reinforced the dominant-party system, and except for a brief period between 2009 and 2012, the opposition parties faced the LDP as a minority force, aided by the proportional representation system. And subsequently Thailand and Russia adopted a parallel system to provide incentives for greater party cohesiveness.

The party is sure to elect the candidates at the top of its list, guaranteeing safe seats for the leadership. By contrast, under the MMP system a party that does well in the local seats might not need or receive any compensatory list seats, so the leadership has to run in the local seats. On the other hand, because of the low reputation of lawmakers elected by proportional representation in Japan, party leaders of major parties are implicitly expected to be elected in their electoral districts. Although political parties can designate the order of the list, it is customary for the order to change according to the percentage of close defeats.

Mixed-member majoritarian systems support the creation of single-party majorities more often than mixed proportional member systems. This may be a positive or a negative depending on the view of the voter.

Use

Current use 

Mixed-member majoritarian systems are primarily used in Asian and some of the European states.

Former use 
Countries that replaced majoritarian representation before 1990 are not (yet) included.

 Santiago del Estero Province, Argentina (1997–2009)

Proposals for use 
In New Zealand, the Royal Commission on the Electoral System reviewed the electoral system in 1985–86 and considered SM to be a possible replacement for plurality voting, which was in use at the time. They suggested the supplementary member system could be implemented in New Zealand with the following features: each elector would have 2 votes, 1 for a constituency candidate and the other for a party list; there would be a total of 120 seats, with 90 seats determined by votes in constituencies and the remaining 30 from party lists; a modified Sainte-Laguë method would be used to allocate list seats proportionate to a party's total share of votes, a threshold of 5% was suggested before parties could be allocated seats.

The commission came to the conclusion that SM would be unable to overcome the shortcomings of New Zealand's previous plurality electoral system (FPP). The total seats won by a party would likely remain out of proportion to its share of votes—there would be a “considerable imbalance between share of the votes and share of the total seats”—and would be unfair to minor parties (who struggle to win constituency seats). In the indicative 1992 electoral referendum, SM was one of the four choices of alternative electoral system (alongside MMP, AV and STV), but came last with only 5.5 percent of the vote. By clear majority, a change to MMP was favoured, as recommended by the Royal Commission, and was subsequently adopted after the 1993 electoral referendum.

In another referendum in 2011, 57.77% of voters elected to keep current the MMP system. Among the 42.23% that voted to change to another system, a plurality (46.66%) preferred a return to the pre-1994 plurality electoral system (also known as First-past-the-post, FPTP). Supplementary member was the second-most popular choice, with 24.14% of the vote.

References

External links 

 A Handbook of Electoral System Design from International IDEA
 Electoral Design Reference Materials from the ACE Project
 Accurate Democracy suggests Parallel Voting by PR and Condorcet rules to make a balanced council with a few central swing voters.

Electoral systems
Mixed electoral systems
Semi-proportional electoral systems